Curses 'N Chaos is a 2D, wave-based, arena-brawler video game with a focus on 2-player co-op by independent developer Tribute Games. The game was released on August 18, 2015 for Windows, OS X, PlayStation 4, and PlayStation Vita.

Gameplay 
The game is a single screen arena brawler where you fight waves of enemies. Players have the ability to craft new items and power ups, as well play alongside a friend, locally or online. The PlayStation platforms support cross-buy, cross-save and cross-play features. Players can choose between one of two heroes, Lea and Leo, to fight in melee combat against progressively more difficult waves of AI enemies.

References

External links

2015 video games
Indie video games
MacOS games
PlayStation 4 games
PlayStation Vita games
PlayStation Network games
Action video games
Video games developed in Canada
Video games with cross-platform play
Windows games
Tribute Games games